Hans-Peter Fürst (born 5 April 1932) is an Austrian sailor. He competed in the Finn event at the 1960 Summer Olympics.

References

External links
 

1932 births
Living people
Austrian male sailors (sport)
Olympic sailors of Austria
Sailors at the 1960 Summer Olympics – Finn
Sportspeople from Vienna